The Congress Street Bridge carries NY 2 across the Hudson River connecting Watervliet, New York with Troy, New York.

See also
List of fixed crossings of the Hudson River

References

Bridges over the Hudson River
Bridges in Rensselaer County, New York
Road bridges in New York (state)
Steel bridges in the United States
Girder bridges in the United States